Judges who have served on the Vice Admiralty Court in New South Wales between 1787 and 1911 include :

 Judges
 Deputy judges
 Surrogate judges.

Notes

References 

Vice Admiralty
New South Wales
Vice Admiralty Court (New South Wales)
New South Wales-related lists